Bovoni is a settlement on the island of Saint Thomas in the United States Virgin Islands.

Bertha C. Boschulte Middle School is located in Bovoni, as is the Bovoni Landfill.

References

Populated places in Saint Thomas, U.S. Virgin Islands
Southside, Saint Thomas, U.S. Virgin Islands